Bilyaletdinov is a Tatar surname that may refer to:

 Diniyar Bilyaletdinov (born 1985), Russian footballer
 Rinat Bilyaletdinov (born 1957), Russian footballer and coach, father of Diniyar
 Zinetula Bilyaletdinov (born 1955), Russian hockey player and coach

Russian-language surnames
Tatar-language surnames